Abhishek Ambekar (born 11 August 1991) is an Indian footballer who plays as a defender for I-League club Mohammedan.

Career

Early career
He began playing football in school,   Smt. Sulochanadevi Singhania School, Thane and represented his school team and his college and state team later. He was roped into the Air India FC under-19 team, coached by former Indian player Godfrey Pereira, who is also from Santacruz.

Air India
The winger eventually graduated to Air India's senior team. Ambekar made his debut for Air India FC of the I-League on 7 October 2012 coming on as a 54th-minute substitute for Ong Lepcha; Air India lost 5–1.

Career pitfalls
Air India FC couldn't play in the I-League further as it didn't satisfy the Asian Football Confederation norms, according to the All India Football Federation. But this didn't hinder Ambekar's career as he joined the newly-floated Mumbai Tigers, which had players like Steven Dias, Paresh Shivalkar under coach Bimal Ghosh, who helped Ambekar improve his game. But the club also couldn't survive for long. He joined Mumbai FC and later got a job with the Reserve Bank of India. The job rules didn't allow him to play at the professional level but he preferred RBI as it offered job security.
During that time he played for Maharashtra in Santosh Trophy.

Later Ambekar was handed a lifeline by RBI, who agreed to release players and encouraged sportspersons to continue playing. It was what he had been waiting for. At the cost of risking his progress at work, Ambekar started sniffing at opportunities to play in the big leagues again. That chance came at fledgling side Minerva, who had finished 9th of 10 teams on their I-League debut last season.

Minerva Punjab
In 2017 he joined Minerva Punjab. He made his debut for Minerva on 25 November 2017 in I-League match against Mohun Bagan at Guru Nanak Stadium, Ludhiana as he played full match and his team drew the match 1-1. He became an inevitable ingredient of the side which eventually won the silverware. The I-League title triumph gave Ambekar's CV a necessary kick which was missing earlier in his career.

Career statistics

Club

Honours

Club
Minerva Punjab
I-League: 2017–18
Mohun Bagan
Calcutta Football League (1): 2018–19

References

Indian footballers
1991 births
Living people
Footballers from Mumbai
I-League players
East Bengal Club players
Association football fullbacks
RoundGlass Punjab FC players
Mumbai Tigers FC players
Mumbai FC players
Mohun Bagan AC players
Mohammedan SC (Kolkata) players
Rajasthan United FC players
Sudeva Delhi FC players